György Sarlós (born 29 July 1940) is a Hungarian rower who competed in the 1960 Summer Olympics, in the 1968 Summer Olympics, and in the 1972 Summer Olympics.

He was born in Budakeszi.

In 1960 he was a crew member of the Hungarian boat which was eliminated in the repechage of the coxless four event.

Four years later he won the silver medal with the Hungarian boat in the coxless fours competition.

At the 1972 Games he and his partner László Balogh were eliminated in the repechage of the coxless pair event.

External links
 profile

1940 births
Living people
Hungarian male rowers
Olympic rowers of Hungary
Rowers at the 1960 Summer Olympics
Rowers at the 1968 Summer Olympics
Rowers at the 1972 Summer Olympics
Olympic silver medalists for Hungary
Olympic medalists in rowing
Medalists at the 1968 Summer Olympics
European Rowing Championships medalists